Konstantin Aleksandrovich Zimulka (born 18 November 1983) is a Russian former professional football player.

Club career
He made his Russian Football National League debut for FC Angusht Nazran on 26 March 2006 in a game against FC Terek Grozny. He spent 6 more seasons in the FNL with FC Dynamo St. Petersburg, FC Yenisey Krasnoyarsk, FC Baltika Kaliningrad and FC Luch-Energiya Vladivostok.

External links
 

1983 births
Association football defenders
Sportspeople from Stavropol
Living people
Russian footballers
FC Dynamo Stavropol players
FC Volga Nizhny Novgorod players
FC Baltika Kaliningrad players
FC Luch Vladivostok players
FC Angusht Nazran players
FC Lokomotiv Moscow players
FC Orenburg players
FC Yenisey Krasnoyarsk players
FC Tambov players
FC Dynamo Saint Petersburg players